Joan of Geneva (born c. 1040; died 1095) was a Countess Consort of Savoy; married to Amadeus II, Count of Savoy.

According to the much later Chronicles of Savoy, Amadeus married Joan, daughter of "Girard, Count of Burgundy", which scholars have surmised to have been Count Gerold of Geneva. The Chronicon Altacumbae says only that "the wife of Amadeus [was] from Burgundy", which might refer to Amadeus I. If his wife were Genevan, it would explain how the house of Savoy came so early to possess a large portion of the Genevois. His wife, whatever her name and origins, bore Amadeus II several children, although there is some uncertainty about how many:
Adelaide, wife of Manasses, sire de Coligny
Ausilia (also Auxilia or Usilia), second wife of Humbert II de Beaujeu, whom she bore four sons by the last decade of the eleventh century: Guichard, Humbert, Guigues, and Hugh

References

1040 births
1095 deaths
Year of birth uncertain
11th-century Italian nobility
11th-century Italian women
Countesses of Savoy
11th-century French people
11th-century French women
House of Geneva